The Jerk, Too is a 1984 American made-for-television comedy film starring Mark Blankfield as title character Navin Johnson, in a reworked version of the 1979 Steve Martin film The Jerk. While Martin is credited as "executive producer" of the film, he did not write or appear in the film.

Plot
Navin Johnson sets out to attend the wedding of Marie, his pen pal in California, but runs into a gang of hobos, led by a schemer named Diesel. Diesel discovers Navin's skill at playing poker and takes Navin to Las Vegas where they win enough to travel to Los Angeles in style.

Cast
 Mark Blankfield as Navin Johnson
 Ray Walston as Diesel
 Robert Sampson as Van Buren
 Patricia Barry as Mrs. Van Buren
 Barrie Ingham as Carl the Butler
 Stacey Nelkin as Marie Van Buren 
 Jean LeClerc as Count Marco
 Thalmus Rasulala as Crossroads
 Pat McCormick as Dudley
 Bill Saluga as Shoes
 Mabel King as Mama Johnson
 Lina Raymond as Cheetah Johnson
 William Smith as Suicide
 Pete Schrum as Ugly Eddie 
 Lainie Kazan as Card Player

References

External links

1984 films
1980s English-language films
1984 television films
1984 comedy films
Television sequel films
Universal Pictures films
NBC network original films
Films directed by Michael Schultz